Randell W. Perry (born June 19, 1976 in Edmonton, Alberta) is a Canadian retired ice hockey defenceman

Career
Beginning in 1992, Perry played junior hockey for the WHL's Lethbridge Hurricanes. After two relatively quiet years, he had a breakout year during the 1993–94 season, registering 56 points in 69 games. Perry would remain with the team the following season, as the Hurricanes made the playoffs. Perry began the 1996–97 season with the Hurricanes as an over-age player, however, after 6 games with the team he was traded to the Seattle Thunderbirds, where he would have a successful year, tallying 46 points in 60 games, and being named as a First Team WHL All-Star. The Thunderbirds would go on to have an extended play-off run, before being swept by the Hurricanes in the WHL Championship Final. 

Following his final junior season, Perry signed a professional contract with the Canadian National Team, who, at the time, played exhibition games across North America. Following his stint with the National Team, Perry moved to Germany in order to sign with the SERC Wild Wings of the DEL. His first year in Schwenningen was moderately productive, registering 13 points in 52 games, as the Wild Wings finished 10th overall. The Wild Wings finished 11th the following the season, with Perry's scoring output dipping to only 5 points in 56 games. At the culmination of the 1999–2000 season, Perry and Wild Wings teammate Mark Kolesar moved to the UK in order to play for reigning BISL Champions, the  London Knights. Perry would have a solid year in London, registering 19 points in 48 games, helping the Knights to a 4th-place finish, before narrowly losing the play-off final to the Sheffield Steelers. 

Louisiana would be Perry's next port of call, playing for the Louisiana IceGators of the ECHL during the 2001–02 season. During his time in Lafayette, Perry registered 30 points in 60 games, and was called up by the IceGators AHL affiliate team, the Houston Aeros. In addition, Perry would also play a handful of games with the Philadelphia Phantoms, also of the AHL.  He returned to Europe for the 2002–03 season, playing for Danish side Herning Blue Fox of the SuperBest Ligaen, he scored 9 points in 28 games as the team finished 3rd in the regular season. Subsequently, Herning would win the play-offs, beating the Odense Bulldogs 3–1 in the final.

Perry returned to North American for the 2003–04 season, playing for multiple teams; the AHL's Manchester Monarchs and Utah Grizzlies, as well as the ECHL's Bakersfield Condors and Greensboro Generals, before finishing the season with the AHL's Bridgeport Sound Tigers. The following season, Perry played exclusively for the Wheeling Nailers, registering 14 points in 69 games. Following the season in West Virginia, Perry would retire from professional hockey, however, he would go on to play senior hockey for the Stony Plain Eagles of the Chinook Hockey League during the 2006–07  season.

Awards and achievements
 WHL (West) First All-Star Team (1997)
 Danish Champion (2003)

Career Statistics

Regular Season and Playoffs

International

References

External links
 

1976 births
Canadian ice hockey defencemen
Ice hockey people from Edmonton
Ice Hockey Superleague players
Canadian expatriate ice hockey players in Denmark
Canadian expatriate ice hockey players in England
Canadian expatriate ice hockey players in Germany
Canadian expatriate ice hockey players in the United States
Living people
Lethbridge Hurricanes players
Schwenninger Wild Wings players
London Knights (UK) players
Herning Blue Fox players
Louisiana IceGators (ECHL) players
Bakersfield Condors (1998–2015) players
Greensboro Generals players
Manchester Monarchs (AHL) players
Wheeling Nailers players
Utah Grizzlies (IHL) players